City Line (Pronounced: HaKav HaIroni) is the name given to a segment of the Green Line that divided the city of Jerusalem from 1948 to 1967. It was 7 km in length, and constituted a temporary boundary line in accordance with Israel's Armistice Agreement with Jordan, which divided the city between East Jerusalem which was part of the Kingdom of Jordan, and West Jerusalem, the capital of the State of Israel. The Old City bordered the City line on the east side, and thus had been part of the "Jordanian Jerusalem". On both sides of the City line fortifications and obstacles were deployed, and different buildings in the city along the line were used as military posts.

History
In November 30, 1948, after the end of the 1948 Arab–Israeli War in Jerusalem, Moshe Dayan, commander of the Israeli Etzioni Brigade, and Abdullah el-Tell, the Jordanian commander, met in an abandoned house in Musrara neighborhood. The two officers drew a map at the scale of 1:20,000, which outlined the boundaries of the ceasefire in Jerusalem. Dayan drew the positions under Israeli control with a green wax pencil line, and el-Tell used a red pencil to outline the positions under Jordanian control. The area between the two lines, along with the thickness of pencils that drew the two lines on the map, determined a No Man's Land along the lines. At the time, it seemed to the parties that it was a temporary ceasefire line, and thus they attached no special significance to the inaccuracies and errors resulting from the thickness of the pencils, slight deviations in the drawings, and segments of discontinuous lines.

A few months later, in April 1949 during the meetings in Rhodes over the 1949 Armistice Agreements at the end of the war, the Dayan and el-Tell map was found to be the only official document indicating the line dividing Jerusalem that was agreed upon by both parties. The inaccurate lines that were drawn loosely thus became a binding international border. The rough map lines had cut across neighborhoods, streets and houses, and were the source of many disputes between the two states. Along the lines, both sides came to hold positions and fortifications, some in residential and urban public institutions. In the No Man's Lands, landmines were deployed.

The entire Old City and the neighborhoods north of it, and the Mount of Olives, were in the Jordanian territories. The west of the city, as well as the Mount Scopus enclave in the north-east of the city was within the Israeli territories. The British Government House (Armon HaNetziv) area was a demilitarized zone controlled by the United Nations, and the house itself was determined to be the headquarters for UN observers. Between the two parts of the city was the Mandelbaum Gate. The crossing was managed by Jordanian and Israeli customs, and primarily served diplomats and UN personnel, as well as Christian pilgrims at Christmas. The crossing also oversaw a bi-weekly convoy to the Israeli enclave on Mount Scopus.

In West Jerusalem, neighborhoods along the line were considered dangerous, and became slum neighborhoods populated by indigents and characterized by poverty and neglect. These included the Shmuel HaNavi neighborhood, Mea Shearim, Musrara, Mamilla, and Yemin Moshe.

The city line divided Jerusalem for 19 years, until the Six-Day War in June 1967. At noon on June 5, 1967, the Jordanians occupied the British Government House from the UN, which marked the beginning of the ground fighting in Jerusalem. The very same day the Israeli Jerusalem Brigade (Brigade 16) captured the British house and the positions to its south. At dawn on June 6, the second day of the war, Israeli paratroop forces broke into the city line in the north, and proceeded to capture the neighborhoods north of the Old City, joining the isolated Mount Scopus. At noon on June 6, the Jerusalem Brigade broke the fences dividing the Abu Tor neighborhood, and the neighborhood conquest completed the encirclement of the Old City. The Old City fell to the IDF on June 7, 1967. Immediately upon the end of the war, fences and concrete walls dividing streets and neighborhoods were torn down, the fortifications were dismantled, and the mines were removed. Israeli sovereignty over East Jerusalem was established, and the two parts of the city were consolidated under the Israeli Jerusalem Municipality, which has made great efforts to obscure and hide the scars of the former city line.

The City line no longer exists as a political border, but in many ways it continues to exist to this very day, dividing the city along ethnic and cultural lines. It is commonly referred as the "Seam line", where the crossing of it is still felt, even in the absence of walls and fences.

Outline

The Green Line encircled Israeli Jerusalem (West Jerusalem) on the south, east and north in the form of a backwards "C". The southern side of the line crossed through the Arab village of Beit Safafa (today a neighborhood in Jerusalem), dividing it in two, separating clans, and leaving families on both sides of the border. From there it went eastward, encircling Kibbutz Ramat Rachel and separating it from the Arab village of Sur Baher, then it turned north, separating the eastern border of the Arnona and Talpiyot neighborhoods from the demilitarized No Man's Land. The future Diplomat Hotel's (former Ganey Yehuda Hotel) western corner would be within 100 meters of the line where it passes through the U.S. consular services building complex. East of Talpiyot the line crosses the ridge containing the 1933 British Government House (Armon HaNetziv) in the demilitarized No Man's Land under UN auspices where the headquarters of UN observers who supervised the armistice was located. Continuing north, the line crossed through the Abu Tor neighborhood and divided it into two. Unlike in Safafa, there were no Arabs left on the western side of the line; their homes were abandoned and later occupied by Jews, who lived very close to their Arab neighbors across the border.

From the Abu Tor ridge the line went down to the Hinnom Valley and Sultan's Pool, crossing through the remains of neighborhoods of Bete Shamaa and Jurat al Anab ("Hutzot Hayotzer"), on the way including in the Israeli territories Mount Zion, adjacent to the Old City on the south, but with no road leading to it. It was only in 1964 that Israel and Jordan jointly built the "Pope's Road" that connected western Jerusalem and Mount Zion, in honor of the visit of Pope Paul VI to the Holy Land. The Sultan's Pool was in no-man's-land, which bordered the houses of the Mishkenot Sha'ananim and Yemin Moshe neighborhoods. From there the line continued north, where it separated the western wall of the Old City (where the Jaffa Gate and the Tower of David are located) from the Mamilla neighborhood and the Jerusalem Old Town Hall. The historic Town Hall, which is located at the IDF Square, still carries to this very day bullet holes as evidence of the conflicts at this location.

From the City Hall building the line paralleled the north-west section of the old city wall, where it separated the Christian Quarter in the north-west of the Old City from the religious institutions that were built by the Christians outside the wall in the "French compound": Saint-Louis Hospital and the Notre-Dame de Jérusalem. The line passed along the northern wall of the Old City past the New Gate to the Damascus Gate along what is now called Paratroopers Street, and then turned north through the Musrara houses along the route now known as the "Engineering Corps Road" and "Bar Lev Road". It is in this area where the Street of the Prophets was partitioned, where the central and western parts of the street were in Israeli territories, while the eastern part remained in Jordan. It separated the neighborhoods of Mea Shearim and Beit Yisrael on the Israeli side from the neighborhood of Husseini, the American Colony and Sheikh Jarrah on the Jordanian side. It is also in this area where the Mandelbaum Gate border crossing was agreed upon, which enabled the passage between the two parts of the city and the Israeli connection to its Mount Scopus enclave.

The northern section of the line, in the area of Jerusalem's contemporary neighborhoods of Ma'alot Dafna and Ramat Eshkol, passed between the neighborhoods of Shmuel HaNavi and Sanhedria on the Israeli side, and the Jordanian positions on Ammunition Hill, the Police Academy, and Givat HaMivtar. Near the line in that section is Sanhedria Cemetery, which was established by the Israelis as an alternative to the cemetery on Mount of Olives, which was controlled by the Jordanians after the 1948 Arab–Israeli War.

Gallery

See also

 Green Line (Israel)
 1949 Armistice Agreements
 Israeli West Bank barrier
 West Jerusalem
 East Jerusalem
 Greater Jerusalem

References

20th century in Jerusalem
Borders of Israel
Divided cities
1940s in Jerusalem
1950s in Jerusalem
1960s in Jerusalem